Kanfanar is a municipality in Istria, Croatia.

Kanfanar lies at the interchange of the Istrian Y motorway A8 and A9, as well as on the Divača – Pula railway, and was formerly the junction of a branchline to Rovinj.

Settlements
The municipality consists 21 settlements: 

Barat
Brajkovići
Bubani
Burići
Červari
Dubravci
Jural
Kanfanar
Korenići
Kurili
Ladići
Marići
Maružini
Matohanci
Mrgani
Okreti
Pilkovići
Putini
Sošići
Šorići
Žuntići

References

External links 

 Municipality  

Municipalities of Croatia
Populated places in Istria County